Olli Haaskivi is a Finnish-American actor.

Early life and family
He was born in Cleveland, Ohio where his father, Finnish soccer player Kai Haaskivi, was playing for the Cleveland Force. When Haaskivi was 8, the family moved to Florida, where he grew up between Bradenton and Sarasota. His cousin is former NHL hockey player Niklas Hagman.

Career
He attended Booker High School in Sarasota beginning in the 9th grade, and upon graduation he studied musical theatre at the University of Michigan School of Music, Theatre & Dance. During his time there, he performed in a production of Seussical alongside Andrew Keenan-Bolger and Benji Pasek. His first onscreen role was in an episode of Unforgettable in 2012.

In 2019, Haaskivi appeared in a small role opposite Edward Norton in Motherless Brooklyn, directed by Norton. He would made a guest appearance in the Marvel Cinematic Universe miniseries The Falcon and the Winter Soldier as Dr. Nagel. In February 2022, he was cast in Oppenheimer, a biopic about J. Robert Oppenheimer directed by Christopher Nolan, and was cast in a recurring role in the Apple TV+ miniseries The Big Cigar later that year.

Personal life
Haaskivi holds dual citizenship between the United States and Finland. Due to an error made when his father was filing citizenship papers on his behalf, Haaskivi was briefly listed amongst Finland's Most Wanted.

Filmography

Film

Television

References

External links

Year of birth missing (living people)
Living people
21st-century American male actors
American male film actors
American male television actors
Male actors from Cleveland
American people of Finnish descent
People from Cleveland
People from Sarasota, Florida
University of Michigan School of Music, Theatre & Dance alumni